Bob Kelsey (27 September 1925 – 19 April 1990) was an Australian rules footballer who played with Carlton in the Victorian Football League (VFL).

Notes

External links 

Bob Kelsey's profile at Blueseum

1925 births
1990 deaths
Carlton Football Club players
Australian rules footballers from Victoria (Australia)
Port Melbourne Football Club players